= Denbigh Arms =

Former pub in Pimlico, London

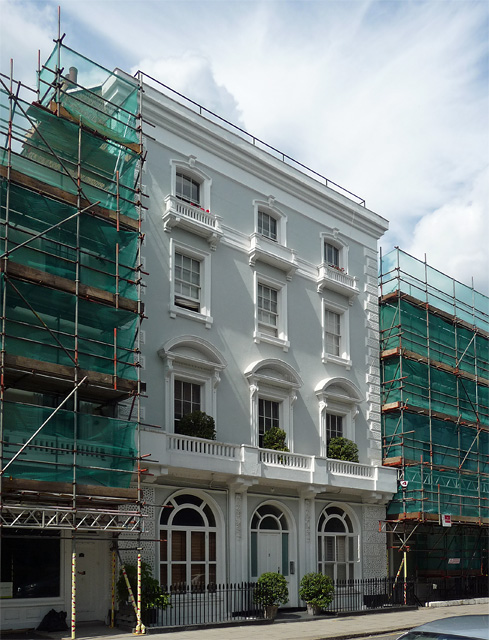
- The building in 2012
- Location: 3 Denbigh Place, Pimlico, London, England, SW1
- Coordinates: 51°29′22.8″N 0°8′24.95″W

Listed Building – Grade II
- Official name: DENBIGH ARMS PUBLIC HOUSE
- Designated: 01-Dec-1987
- Reference no.: 1066924

The Denbigh Arms is a former pub at 3 Denbigh Place, Pimlico, London, England, SW1.

It is a Grade II listed building, built in the mid 19th century. The pub closed in 1998 and the building is now a private house.
